Malcolm Ian Sinclair, 20th Earl of Caithness,  (born 3 November 1948), is a Scottish Conservative politician and member of the House of Lords as one of the remaining hereditary peers. He is also 20th Lord Berriedale, 15th Baronet, of Canisbay, Co. Caithness, and chief of Clan Sinclair. He is the Chief Executive of the Clan Sinclair Trust.

Education
Sinclair was educated at Blairmore School, Aberdeenshire (then Marlborough College), and the Royal Agricultural College, Cirencester.

House of Lords and political offices
Malcolm Caithness served as a House of Lords government-whip under Margaret Thatcher from 1984 to 1985. He then moved to the Department of Transport as a Parliamentary Under Secretary of State, serving until 1986, the year when he became Minister of State at the Home Office. In 1988, he was once appointed Minister of State at the Department of Environment. In 1989, he became Paymaster-General and a Minister of State in the Treasury.

In 1990, Caithness was appointed Minister of State at the Foreign Office, and then, in 1992, back to the Department of Transport. He married Diana Caroline Coke (1953–1994) in 1975. He was made a privy counsellor in 1990.

With the passage of the House of Lords Act 1999, Caithness, along with most other hereditary peers, lost his automatic right to sit in the House of Lords. He was, however, elected as one of the 90 representative peers designed under the provisions of the act to remain in the House of Lords. According to the Electoral Reform Society, he has since blocked further reform of the Lords, tabling 'wrecking' amendments to a draft Bill to abolish by-elections for hereditary peers, proposed by Lord Grocott in 2018.

Caithness is an opponent of fractional-reserve banking.

Caithness was a trustee of Queen Elizabeth Castle of Mey Trust, from its inception in 1996 until 2016. In 1999, he helped found a heritage charity, the Clan Sinclair Trust, the aim of which is the preservation and conservation of Castle Sinclair Girnigoe, near Wick in Caithness. He serves as chief executive and has been responsible for getting the castle listed by the World Monuments Fund in its Watch List of the 100 Most Endangered Sites in the World in 2002, the fundraising and overseeing the remedial works which has allowed the castle to be accessible and open to the public.

Personal life
Sinclair's mother was Madeleine de Pury, possibly descended from the de Pury family of Neuchâtel, Switzerland, who were members of the Prussian nobility.

In January 1994, Caithness resigned from his post at the Ministry of Transport, following the suicide of his wife, Diana Caroline Coke. In 2004, he married Leila C. Jenkins in Rosslyn Chapel, whom he had met at Ascot, and he filed for divorce a year later.

His children are Lady Iona Alexandra Sinclair (b. 1978), and Alexander James Richard Sinclair, Lord Berriedale (b. 1981).

Clan Sinclair
There are Clan Sinclair associations in the UK, Australia, Canada, Italy, and the USA.

Malcolm Sinclair has organized the first Clan Sinclair International Gathering in Caithness in 2000, and then again in 2002, 2005, 2008, 2010, 2012 (in Norway), and 2015.

In 2009, Sinclair, referring to the role of Clan Chiefs, said "I do not believe there is an obligation towards the clan in any formal sense. For many years I took no interest in the Clan because I was too busy earning a living and bringing up the family...If a chief can give the time, particularly to the Diaspora, then there are huge rewards for everyone and I would hope that most chiefs can do that".

References

External links

Hereditary Chief, Clan Sinclair, Caithness

1948 births
Living people
People educated at Blairmore School
People educated at Marlborough College
Alumni of the Royal Agricultural University
Conservative Party (UK) Baronesses- and Lords-in-Waiting
Earls of Caithness
Scottish clan chiefs
Members of the Privy Council of the United Kingdom
Malcolm
Hereditary peers elected under the House of Lords Act 1999